The Naked Truth may refer to:

Literature
 The Naked Truth (novel), a 1993 fictional memoir by Leslie Nielsen
 The Naked Truth (book), a 2007 commentary on film ratings

Film
 The Naked Truth (1914 film), a silent Italian film
 The Naked Truth (1915 film), an alternative title for Hypocrites, a 1915 American silent film
 The Naked Truth (1932 film), an American German-language comedy film
 The Naked Truth (1957 film), a British film comedy
 The Naked Truth (1992 film), a comedy film

Music
 The Naked Truth (Golden Earring album), 1992
 The Naked Truth (Lil' Kim album), 2005
 Naked Truth (Sarah Hudson album), 2005
 Naked Truth (Jeanette album), 2006
 Naked Truth (band), an Atlanta, Georgia-based quartet

TV
 The Naked Truth (TV), a Russian television program hosted by Svetlana Pesotskaya
 The Naked Truth (TV series), an American television sitcom
 "The Naked Truth" (Falcon Crest), an episode of Falcon Crest
 "The Naked Truth", an episode of Home Improvement
 "The Naked Truth", an episode of Related
 "The Naked Truth" (How I Met Your Mother)
 "The Naked Truth", an episode of Pretty Little Liars

Other
 The Naked Truth (statue), a statue in St. Louis
 Naked Truth, a character in the 1915 silent film Hypocrites